Angel Eyes is the 30th studio album by country singer Willie Nelson.

Track listing 
"Angel Eyes" (Earl Brent, Matt Dennis)
"Tumbling Tumbleweeds" (Bob Nolan)
"I Fall in Love Too Easily" (Jule Styne)
"Thank You"
"My Window Faces the South" (Jerry Livingston, Mitchell Parish, Abner Silver)
"Gypsy" (Billy Reid)
"There Will Never Be Another You" (Mack Gordon, Harry Warren)
"Samba for Charlie"

Personnel 
Willie Nelson - guitar, vocals
Ray Charles - guest vocals on "Angel Eyes"
Jackie King - guitar
Jon Blondell - bass
Don Hass - keyboards
Bob Scott - drums, percussion
Technical
Bobby Arnold, Larry Greenhill - engineer
Denny Purcell - mastering
Willie Nelson - producer

References

1984 albums
Willie Nelson albums
Columbia Records albums
Covers albums
Traditional pop albums